The Globu is a right tributary of the river Mehadica in Romania. It discharges into the Mehadica in Iablanița.

References

Rivers of Romania
Rivers of Caraș-Severin County